Coleophora tractella is a moth of the family Coleophoridae. It is found in Switzerland.

References

tractella
Moths of Europe
Moths described in 1849